Egon Jensen (13 November 1937 – 13 September 2020) was a Danish footballer who played as a midfielder for Esbjerg fB. He made 12 appearances for the Denmark national team from 1957 to 1966.

References

1937 births
2020 deaths
People from Haderslev Municipality
Danish men's footballers
Association football midfielders
Denmark international footballers
Esbjerg fB players
Danish football managers
Esbjerg fB managers
Sportspeople from the Region of Southern Denmark